David Der-wei Wang (born November 6, 1954) is a literary historian, critic, and the Edward C. Henderson Professor of Chinese Literature at Harvard University. He has written extensively on post-late Qing Chinese fiction, comparative literary theory, colonial and modern Taiwanese literature, diasporic literature, Chinese Malay literature, Sinophone literature, and Chinese intellectuals and artists in the 20th century. His notions such as "repressed modernities", "post-loyalism", and "modern lyrical tradition" are instrumental and widely discussed in the field of Chinese literary studies.

Life and career
David Der-wei Wang was born in Taipei. He graduated from Cheng Kung Senior High School and took his B.A. in Foreign Languages and Literature from National Taiwan University and his M.A. (1978) and Ph.D. (1982) in Comparative Literature from the University of Wisconsin at Madison. Wang taught at National Taiwan University (1982-1986), Harvard University (1986-1990), and Columbia University (1990-2004). He served as the head of the Department of East Asian Languages and Cultures at Columbia University (designated in 1997), when he taught there as the Dean Lung Professor of Chinese Studies. In 2000, he succeeded Irene Bloom as chair of the University Committee on Asia and the Middle East. In 2004, he rejoined Harvard University and was named Edward C. Henderson Professor of East Asian Languages and Cultures. Wang received the Changjiang Scholar Award in the People's Republic of China in 2008. He was the 2013-14 Humanitas Visiting Professor of Chinese Studies at the Centre for Research in the Arts, Social Sciences and Humanities at Cambridge University, where he gave 3 public lectures on the "Chineseness" of Chinese literature. He is one of the chapter contributors of The Cambridge History of Chinese Literature.

In addition, Wang has been the editor of "Modern Chinese Literature from Taiwan" series published by Columbia University Press which include works by writers such as Huang Chun-ming, Yang Mu, and Chu Tʽien-wen.

Wang was elected as an Academician of Academia Sinica (2004) and member of the American Academy of Arts and Sciences (2020). Aside from his scholarship, Wang has written numerous book reviews in Chinese since 1980s and is recognised as an active and accomplished literary critic in Taiwan. He received the National Award for Arts in Taiwan for a volume of critical writings on Chinese fiction in 1993. He also translated Michel Foucault's The Archaeology of Knowledge into Chinese.

Selected works

. The first full-length English language survey of late Qing dynasty fiction, it has been praised as a major contribution to scholarship on the fiction of the era.
. Reflections on violence in Chinese fiction and real-world history, covering famous writers such as Lu Xun and Mao Dun as well as less-well-known ones from mainland China and Taiwan.
. A collection of essays discussing the history of modern literary creation in three cities: Hong Kong, Shanghai, and Taipei.

(co-edited with Carlos Rojas)
 (co-edited with Ping-hui Liao)

References

External links
List of recent publications (hosted by the Academia Sinica)
David Wang | East Asian Languages and Civilizations (Harvard University)

Living people
University of Wisconsin–Madison College of Letters and Science alumni
Columbia University faculty
Harvard University faculty
Taiwanese emigrants to the United States
1954 births
Members of Academia Sinica